Fourplay (also known as Londinium) is a 2001 American-British romantic comedy film.

Plot
Fourplay follows the romantically entwined lives of a TV writer, producer, actress and makeup artist. Ben Greene (Binder) is an American comic writer who comes to Britain to write for a show, Telford Gate. The star of the show, Carly Matthews-Portland (Hemingway), is married to the producer, Allan (Firth). Carly decides to help Greene, by setting him up on a date with a French makeup artist, Fiona Delgrazia (Irène Jacob). As the movie progresses, the lives of the couples become more entwined and they each decide if they are in the right relationship or not.

Cast
 Colin Firth as Allen Portland
 Mike Binder as Ben Greene
 Irène Jacob as Fiona Delgrazia
 Mariel Hemingway as Carly Matthews Portland
 Stephen Fry as Nigel Steele
 Jack Dee as Glen
 Christopher Lawford as Davis
 Stephen Marcus as Davey
 Vincent Grass as Fiona's Father

Reception
The film did not receive many reviews. The critic at scoopy.net gave it a D, suggesting it would not even appeal to fans of the genre. Qwipster found the movie "Tepid at best".

Home release
Released on DVD on December 7, 2004.

References

External links
 
 

2001 independent films
2001 romantic comedy films
2001 films
American romantic comedy films
The Asylum films
British romantic comedy films
American independent films
Films directed by Mike Binder
Sunlight Productions films
British independent films
Films about actors
Films about film directors and producers
Films about screenwriters
2000s English-language films
2000s American films
2000s British films